Mary Delgado (8 October 1916 – 13 April 1984) was a Spanish actress. She worked with director Rafael Gil on Light Footprint (1941) and with Antonio Casal on Heloise Beneath an Almond Tree (1943), The Ghost and Mrs. Juanita (1945) and Thirsty Land (1945).

Selected filmography
 Eloisa Is Under an Almond Tree (1943)
 Thirsty Land  (1945)
 The Phantom and Dona Juanita (1945)
 The Sunless Street (1948)
 Just Any Woman (1949)
 The Great Galeoto (1951)

External
Mary Delgado at IMDb

1916 births
1984 deaths
Spanish stage actresses
Spanish film actresses
Spanish television actresses
20th-century Spanish actresses